Andy Granda (born 4 February 1992) is a Cuban judoka. He won the gold medal in the men's +100 kg event at the 2019 Pan American Games held in Lima, Peru.

In 2014, he won the gold medal in the men's team event at the Central American and Caribbean Games held in Veracruz, Mexico. Four years later, in 2018, he won the gold medal in both the men's +100 kg event and the men's team event at the 2018 Central American and Caribbean Games held in Barranquilla, Colombia.

In 2020, he won one of the bronze medals in the men's +100 kg event at the Judo Grand Slam Paris held in Paris, France. In the same year, he won the gold medal in the men's +100 kg event at the 2020 Pan American Judo Championships held in Guadalajara, Mexico.

In 2021, he competed in the men's +100 kg event at the Judo World Masters held in Doha, Qatar. He also competed in the men's +100 kg event at the 2021 World Judo Championships in Budapest, Hungary.

He represented Cuba at the 2020 Summer Olympics in Tokyo, Japan. He competed in the men's +100 kg event where he was eliminated in his first match.

He won one of the bronze medals in his event at the 2022 Judo Grand Slam Antalya held in Antalya, Turkey. He is the currently world champion having won the final against Saito Tatsuro from Japan at the 2022 World Judo Championships.

References

External links
 
 
 

Living people
1992 births
Sportspeople from Matanzas
Cuban male judoka
Pan American Games medalists in judo
Pan American Games gold medalists for Cuba
Medalists at the 2019 Pan American Games
Judoka at the 2019 Pan American Games
Central American and Caribbean Games gold medalists for Cuba
Central American and Caribbean Games medalists in judo
Competitors at the 2014 Central American and Caribbean Games
Competitors at the 2018 Central American and Caribbean Games
Judoka at the 2020 Summer Olympics
Olympic judoka of Cuba
21st-century Cuban people